The Sound of Musicals was a 2006 four part BBC series starring several different musical theatre actors and some other professional singers who performed acts from different musicals. Each week the standard cast was joined by a celebrity guest host who also performed their favourite numbers. The show also featured interviews with people involved in musical theatre such as Andrew Lloyd Webber, and Cameron Mackintosh.

It aired weekly (every Saturday) for four weeks starting Saturday 14 January 2006.

Filming 
Each part of the show was filmed in front of a live audience during the autumn of 2005 the dates of filming are as follows – 30 September, 2 October, 4 and 6 October.

Standard cast 
 John Barrowman
 Carrie Grant
 David Grant
 Ruthie Henshall
 Jon Lee
 Mica Paris

Guest hosts 
 Jill Halfpenny
 Aled Jones
 Les Dennis

Other singers 
 Joseph McManners (one episode)

Songs Performed

Episode One

Week 1 Closing Medley—Jesus Christ Superstar, The Time Warp, (The Rocky Horror Show, John
Barrowman), Tell Me It's Not True (Blood Brothers, Jill Halfpenny), Seasons of Love (Rent,
Jon Lee, Carrie & David Grant), Memory (Cats, Mica Paris), One Day More (Les Misérables, John Barrowman, Jon Lee, Ruthie Henshall, Carrie Grant, & Company)

Episode Two

Week 2 Opening Medley: Comedy Tonight (Cast), Broadway Baby (Carrie Grant), You Can't Take That Away From Me (John Barrowman), On The Street Where You Live (Jon Lee), I Won't Send Roses (David Grant), All That Jazz (Ruthie Henshall)

Week 2 Closing Cole Porter Medley: Anything Goes (Ruthie Henshall), My Heart Belongs to Daddy (Carrie Grant), Too Darn Hot (Mica Paris), Who Wants to be a Millionaire (David Grant, Carrie Grant)

Episode Three

Week 3 Introduction—Wilkommen (John Barrowman), Hello Dolly (Ruthie Henshall), If They Could See Me Now (Carrie Grant), Matchmaker, Matchmaker (Mica Paris), Edelweiss (Jon Lee), Somewhere (David Grant & Company)

Children's Medley (closing) -- Chitty Chitty Bang Bang (Chitty Chitty Bang Bang, Jon Lee, David Grant, Ruthie Henshall, Les Dennis, Joseph McManners), Supercalifragilistic (Mary Poppins, Ruthie Henshall & same), Part of Your World (The Little Mermaid, Carrie Grant), Bad Guys (Bugsy Malone, Jon Lee & David Grant), The Bare Necessities (The Jungle Book, Les Dennis & Joseph McManners), Tomorrow (Annie, Ruthie Henshall & company)

Episode Four

Week 4 (Finale) Medley—There's No Business Like Show Business (Annie Get Your Gun, Company), Come on Get Happy (Ruthie Henshall), Good Morning (Singing in the Rain, Jon Lee, Carrie & David Grant), Try To Remember (The Fantasticks, John Barrowman & Company), There's No Business Like Show Business (Annie Get Your Gun, Company)

Medleys 
 Week 1 Closing Medley—Jesus Christ Superstar, The Time Warp, (The Rocky Horror Show, John Barrowman), Tell Me It's Not True (Blood Brothers, Jill Halfpenny), Seasons of Love (Rent, Jon Lee, Carrie & David Grant), Memory (Cats, Mica Paris), One Day More (Les Misérables, John Barrowman, John Lee, Ruthie Hensall, Carrie Grant, & Company)
 Week 2 Introduction—Comedy Tonight (John Barrowman, Carrie and David Grant, Ruthie Henshall, Jon Lee), Broadway Baby (Follies, Carrie Grant), You Can't Take That Away from Me (Crazy for You, John Barrowman), The Street Where You Live (My Fair Lady, John Lee)
 Week 3 Introduction—Wilkommen (Cabaret, John Barrowman), Hello Dolly (Hello Dolly, Ruthie Henshall), If They Could See Me Now (Sweet Charity, Carrie Grant), Matchmaker, Matchmaker (Fiddler on the Roof, Mica Paris), Edelweiss (The Sound of Music, Jon Lee), Somewhere a Place For Us (West Side Story, David Grant & Company)
 Week 4 (Finale) Medley—There's No Business Like Show Business (Annie Get Your Gun, Company), Get Happy (Ruthie Henshall), Good Morning (Singing in the Rain, Jon Lee, Carrie & David Grant), Try To Remember (The Fantasticks, John Barrowman & Company), There's No Business Like Show Business (Annie Get Your Gun, Company)
 Children's Medley (closing) -- Chitty Chitty Bang Bang (Chitty Chitty Bang Bang, Jon Lee, David Grant, Ruthie Henshall, Les Dennis, Joseph McManners), Supercalifragilistic (Mary Poppins, Ruthie Henshall & same), Part of Your World (The Little Mermaid, Carrie Grant), Bad Guys (Bugsy Malone, Jon Lee & David Grant), The Bare Necessities (The Jungle Book, Les Dennis & Joseph McManners), Tomorrow (Annie, Ruthie Henshall & company)

External links

BBC Television shows
2006 British television series debuts